Tanikaze (谷風, Valley Wind) was the second and last of the s built for the Imperial Japanese Navy during World War I.

Design and description
The Kawakaze-class destroyers were enlarged and faster versions of the preceding  with a more powerful armament. Tanikaze was powered by two Brown-Curtis geared steam turbines, each driving one shaft using steam produced by four Type Ro Kampon water-tube boilers. Their crew consisted of 128 officers and ratings.

The main armament of the Kawakaze-class ships consisted of three quick-firing (QF)  guns; one gun each was located at the bow and stern with the third gun positioned abaft the bridge on the forecastle deck. Their torpedo armament consisted of three twin rotating mounts for  torpedoes; two mounts were located between the stern gun and the funnels while the third mount was placed between the forward funnel and the forecastle. The ships were later rearmed with two triple-tube mounts in lieu of their twin mounts.

Construction and career
Tanikaze was launched on 20 July 1918 at the Maizuru Naval Arsenal and completed on 30 January 1919. She was decommissioned on 1 April 1934 and hulked as Haikan No. 19. The ship served as a training ship for Kaiten manned torpedoes in 1944. The vessel was subsequently scuttled as a breakwater at Kure before it was later broken up.

References

Bibliography

1918 ships
Ships built by Maizuru Naval Arsenal
Kawakaze-class destroyers